The La Salle College of Lucas do Rio Verde is a Brazilian private college located to the north of Mato Grosso in Lucas do Rio Verde, Brazil.

References

Lucas do Rio Verde
Education in Mato Grosso
Educational institutions established in 1999
1999 establishments in Brazil